Veitastrond Chapel is a chapel in Luster Municipality in Vestland county, Norway. It is located in the village of Veitastrond. It is an annex chapel in the Hafslo parish which is part of the Sogn prosti (deanery) in the Diocese of Bjørgvin. The white, wooden chapel was built as a bedehus in 1928. The chapel seats about 120 people.

History
In 1891, the village of Veidastrond received permission to build a cemetery. The people still continued to ask for their own chapel. In 1928, a small  (prayer house) was built in the village. On 14 July 1935, it was consecrate to be used for church functions and received the designation of chapel. In 1960, a new entrance was built for the chapel. In the early 1970s, the building was expanded by adding a bathroom.

See also
List of churches in Bjørgvin

References

Luster, Norway
Churches in Vestland
Long churches in Norway
Wooden churches in Norway
20th-century Church of Norway church buildings
Churches completed in 1928
1928 establishments in Norway